Palpada alhambra is a species of syrphid fly in the family Syrphidae.

References

Eristalinae
Articles created by Qbugbot
Insects described in 1925
Taxa named by Frank Montgomery Hull
Hoverflies of North America